What You Gonna Do When the World's on Fire? is a 2018 Italian documentary film directed by Roberto Minervini. It was selected to be screened in the main competition section of the 75th Venice International Film Festival.

See also
List of black films of the 2010s

References

External links
 

2018 films
2018 drama films
Italian documentary films
1091 Media films
2010s English-language films
2010s Italian films